Arun Vaidyanathan (born in Sirkazhi, Tamil Nadu, India) is an Indian-American film director, producer and screenwriter of feature films, short films and television dramas. He directed his first full-length feature film in Tamil, Achchamundu! Achchamundu!, which released in July 2009. He produced a Tamil romantic-comedy film, Kalyana Samayal Saadham in 2013. In 2014, he directed Mohanlal in a Malayalam political satire film, Peruchazhi.

Early life and career
Arun Vaidyanathan was born and raised in Sirkali, a remote town in the state of Tamil Nadu, India. He watched movies during his childhood as it served as his only entertainment. In school, he was very much interested in music and dance and held the talent of receiving an applauding audience. He also discovered a talent for mimicry, which he pursued in college. This led to jobs in the television field. He wrote scripts, directed and performed in the leading television programs of South India aired on Sun TV and Raj TV. On Raj TV, he worked on a program called Hollywood Special where reviews about American films were given in Tamil. He loved that job and learned of many Hollywood films he would not have otherwise been exposed to.

Ever the pragmatist, after completing his education in Computer Science, he joined a leading software company which allowed him to migrate to New Jersey, United States. He then completed a New York Film Academy program and began directing short English films.

In 2008, he began working on his debut Tamil feature film, Achchamundu! Achchamundu!. Is a Tamil social thriller starring Prasanna, Sneha and Emmy Award-winning American film actor John Shea. The film was shot in New Jersey and New York during early 2008 and subsequently released in 2009. The film premiered in New Jersey's Garden State Film Festival, and shared 'Best Homegrown Feature Film' award with Dorothy Lyman's Split Ends
Ethaya Rajan along with Ananth Govindan produced an Indian Tamil romantic-comedy film written and directed by RS Prasanna, Kalyana Samayal Saadham. It features Prasanna and Lekha Washington in lead roles, Krishnan Vasant and Arora as the cinematographer and music composer respectively. The film was covered as part of the TV series Born to Explore with Richard Wiese. Richard Wiese, who features in the show, in his interview with KSS director RS Prasanna, focused on two points – Indian weddings, their universal appeal, and the growing interest in stories and movies based in India

He then made his Malayalam debut with the Mohanlal-starrer Peruchazhi. The type of humour used in the film was inspired by Cho Ramaswamy's 1971 Tamil classic political-satire film Muhammad bin Tughluq, but Peruchazhi has a pan Indian narrative. Besides Mohanlal in the lead, the film featured an ensemble cast with Mukesh, Ragini Nandwani, Baburaj, Aju Varghese and Vijay Babu among others. The cinematography was done by Arvind Krishna. The songs and background score for the movie was composed by Arrora (Naveen Iyer). Ajayan Venugopalan along with the director co-wrote the dialogues.

He then directed Nibunan starring Arjun Sarja, Varalakshmi Sarathkumar, Prasanna, Sruthi Hariharan, Vaibhav Reddy, Suhasini Maniratnam and Suman, Along with Anand Raghav, he has penned the dialogues and screenplay for the film which is being produced by Passion Film Factory who also produced Kappal (2014).

Filmography

Feature films

Short films

References

External links

Living people
American film directors of Indian descent
Tamil film directors
Tamil-language film directors
Tamil screenwriters
American male film actors
American Hindus
Malayalam film directors
Kannada film directors
English-language film directors
Indian emigrants to the United States
21st-century Indian film directors
People from Mayiladuthurai district
Screenwriters from Tamil Nadu
Film directors from Tamil Nadu
Year of birth missing (living people)